Harry Guy Stockwell (November 16, 1933 – February 6, 2002) was an American actor who appeared in nearly 30 movies and 250 television series episodes.

Life and career
Stockwell was born in New York City, the son of singer/dancer Elizabeth "Betty" Margareta Veronica and Harry Stockwell.  Guy's father, a baritone singer/actor on Broadway, was famously known for singing the voice of Prince Charming in Disney's animated film Snow White and the Seven Dwarfs. Guy's younger brother was actor Dean Stockwell.

Stockwell began his acting career on the stage, working in the Broadway productions Innocent Voyage with his brother Dean and Chicken Every Sunday. That affinity for the stage would later inspire him to become a co-founder of the Los Angeles Art Theater. He then went on to hold the recurring role of Chris Parker from 1961 to 1962 in twenty-six episodes of the ABC series Adventures in Paradise, starring Gardner McKay as the skipper of a sailing vessel set in the South Pacific.

Stockwell was also cast in episodes of The Roaring 20s, Perry Mason (Season 8, Episode 5), Quincy, M.E., Simon & Simon, Knight Rider, Tales of the Gold Monkey, The Eddie Capra Mysteries, Magnum, P.I., Murder, She Wrote, Columbo, Quantum Leap (with his brother, Dean), Bonanza, Land of the Giants, Tombstone Territory, Combat!, The Richard Boone Show, Gunsmoke, Wagon Train,The Virginian and Return to Peyton Place. He had important roles in several major motion pictures including  The War Lord co-starring with Charlton Heston, The Plainsman, the leading role in Beau Geste, Tobruk, The Monitors, It's Alive and Santa Sangre.

Stockwell suffered from diabetes in later years and died of its complications. He was married and divorced three times and had three children.

Filmography

 The Green Years (1946) - Young Boy (uncredited)
 The Mighty McGurk (1947) - Kid (uncredited)
 The Romance of Rosy Ridge (1947) - Joe (uncredited)
 Ask Any Girl (1959) - Boyfriend (uncredited)
 The Beat Generation (1959) - Hank - Police Detective (uncredited)
 The Gazebo (1959) - (voice, uncredited)
 Please Don't Eat the Daisies (1960) - Young Man (uncredited)
 Three Swords of Zorro (1963) - Zorro
 The War Lord (1965) - Draco
 Blindfold (1966) - James Fitzpatrick
 And Now Miguel (1966) - George Perez
 The Plainsman (1966) - Buffalo Bill Cody
 Beau Geste  (1966) - Beau Geste
 Tobruk (1967) - Lt. Mohnfeld
 Banning (1967) - Jonathan Linus
 The King's Pirate (1967) - John Avery
 In Enemy Country (1968) - Braden
 The Monitors (1969) - Harry Jordan
 The Gatling Gun (1971) - Lt. Wayne Malcolm
 It's Alive (1974) - Bob Clayton
 The Disappearance of Flight 412 (1974) - Colonel Trottman
 Airport 1975 (1974) - Colonel Moss
 Burned at the Stake (1981) - Dr. Grossinger
 Forty Days of Musa Dagh (1982) - Simon Tomassian
 Grotesque (1988) - Orville Kruger
 Santa Sangre (1989) - Orgo

References

External links 

 
 

1933 births
2002 deaths
American male film actors
American male television actors
Male actors from Hollywood, Los Angeles
Deaths from diabetes
20th-century American male actors
Universal Pictures contract players